Matthew Kaplan (14 April 1984) better known as Matt Kaplan is an American film producer and businessman. He is known for producing young adult films, including To All the Boys film series. He is the founder and CEO of Ace Entertainment and former president of Awesomeness Films.

Biography 
Kaplan graduated from Columbia University, where he was a quarterback on the Columbia Lions football team.

After college, he was hired by CBS President and CEO Les Moonves as an intern, before becoming director of digital development for the company. He then jumped to Lionsgate Films, rising to SVP Development and Production, overseeing projects such as They Came Together starring Amy Poehler and Paul Rudd.

Kaplan founded Chapter One Films in 2013 and signed a first-look deal with Blumhouse Productions, during which he produced movies including 6 Miranda Drive and The Lazarus Effect.

In 2015, he was tapped by Jeffrey Katzenberg to head the film division of Awesomeness. He founded Ace Entertainment in 2017, which produced the film To All the Boys I've Loved Before and its sequels.

Filmography

Film 
Producer
 The Lazarus Effect (2015)
 Visions (2015)
 Dance Camp (2016)
 Shovel Buddies (2016)
 The Darkness (2016)
 Before I Fall (2017)
 Stephanie (2017)
 You Get Me (2017)
 Irreplaceable You (2018)
 To All the Boys I've Loved Before (2018)
 The Perfect Date (2019)
 To All the Boys: P.S. I Still Love You (2020)
 Body Cam (2020)
 Spontaneous (2020)
 To All the Boys: Always and Forever (2021)
 Hello, Goodbye, and Everything In Between (2022)
 The Statistical Probability of Love at First Sight (2022)
 I Wish You All the Best (TBD)

Television 
Executive producer
 Clark and Michael (2007)
 Ascension (2014)
 My Dead Ex (2018)
 Are You Afraid of the Dark? (2019–2021)
 XO, Kitty (TBD)

Personal life 
From 2001 to 2004, while attending Columbia University, Kaplan dated former actress and now fashion designer Ashley Olsen. He married actress Claire Holt in 2016 before divorcing in 2017.

References 

Living people
American entertainment industry businesspeople
American chief executives
American film producers
Columbia Lions football players
CBS people
1984 births